The men's 'Hard Styles' category involved twelve contestants from eight countries across two continents - Europe and North America.  Each contestant went through seven performances (2 minutes each) with the totals added up at the end of the event.  The gold medallist was Great Britain's Daniel Sterling, silver was awarded to the United States's Robert Andreozzi and bronze to Russian Andrey Bosak.  All three of these men would also be joint runners up in the 'Hard Styles with Weapons' category, with Bosak claiming a gold and silver as well in the two 'Soft Styles' categories.

Results

See also
List of WAKO Amateur World Championships
List of WAKO Amateur European Championships
List of male kickboxers

References

External links
 WAKO World Association of Kickboxing Organizations Official Site

Kickboxing events at the WAKO World Championships 2007 Coimbra
2007 in kickboxing
Kickboxing in Portugal